Rogues and Vagabonds is a 1927 historical novel by the British writer Compton Mackenzie. It is set in the Victorian era.

References

Bibliography
 David Joseph Dooley. Compton Mackenzie. Twayne Publishers, 1974.
 Andro Linklater. Compton Mackenzie: A Life Hogarth Press, 1992.

External links
 

1927 British novels
Novels by Compton Mackenzie
British historical novels
Novels set in London
Novels set in the 19th century
Cassell (publisher) books
George H. Doran Company books